Malcolm Cuming (born 23 January 1976) is an Australian professional darts player playing in Professional Darts Corporation (PDC) events. He qualified for the 2019 BDO World Darts Championship.

Career 
In 2018, Cuming qualified for the 2019 BDO World Darts Championship as the Australian qualifier, he finished second in the Darts Australia rankings behind Justin Thompson, who already qualified via the BDO rankings. He lost to Justin Thompson in the preliminary round.

World Championship results

BDO
 2019: Preliminary round (lost to Justin Thompson 0–3) (sets)

PDC
 2023: First round (lost to Alan Soutar 0–3)

References 

Living people
Australian darts players
1976 births
British Darts Organisation players
Professional Darts Corporation associate players
People from Melbourne